Afrixalus osorioi is a species of frog in the family Hyperoliidae. It is found in Angola, Democratic Republic of the Congo, Gabon, western Kenya, and Uganda. The specific name osorioi honours Balthazar Osório, a Portuguese ichthyologist. Its common names include Angola banana frog, Osorio's spiny reed frog, Congro spiny reed frog, and forest tree frog.

Description
They have a light and dark brown dorsal pattern that normally include a rectangular dark dorsal spot and which extends to the anus. Males have small, scattered, and inconspicuous asperities on the dorsal surfaces of head, body, and limbs. The tibia have light upper side.

The male advertisement call consists of a series of clicks emitted at a rate of 18–30 per second.

Habitat and conservation
Afrixalus osorioi occurs in degraded secondary forests and heavily degraded former forests (including farm bush) of the central African rainforest belt. Breeding takes place in small temporary and permanent water bodies with overhanging vegetation. They also use artificial water bodies such as old drums. It is an abundant and adaptable species that is unlikely to face significant threats. It occurs in several protected areas.

References

osorioi
Frogs of Africa
Amphibians of Angola
Amphibians of the Democratic Republic of the Congo
Amphibians of Gabon
Amphibians of Kenya
Amphibians of Uganda
Amphibians described in 1906
Taxonomy articles created by Polbot